is a Japanese actress. She won the award for Best Actress at the 15th Yokohama Film Festival for Bloom in the Moonlight.

Filmography

References

External links

1967 births
Japanese actresses
Living people
Actors from Niigata Prefecture